Jack Peterson may refer to:

 Jack Richard Peterson, (born 1998), American media personality
 Jack Peterson (field hockey), (1880–?), Irish field hockey player
 Jack Peterson (rugby league), Australian rugby league footballer

See also
 John Peterson (disambiguation)